Hamilton County Schools (or Hamilton County Department of Education) is the school district that serves Hamilton County, Tennessee, USA. After a 1995 referendum, the then-separate Chattanooga City Schools district was merged into the county district in 1997. About 2,300 high school seniors graduated from the system in May 2011.

District Leadership and Schools
The Department of Education serves about 45,000 students in Hamilton County with 2,914 teachers at 79 schools. The schools are divided into five learning communities. Hamilton County's superintendent is Dr. Justin Robertson and the district's Deputy Superintendent is Dr. Sonia Stewart.

High schools
The Secondary Education Division provides 17 high schools to serve students in grades 9–12.

Brainerd (District 5) 
Central (District 9) 
East Ridge (District 8) 
Hamilton County (District 9) 
Hixson (District 3) 
Howard School 
Ivy Academy 
Ooltewah (District 9) 
Red Bank (District 2) 
Sequoyah (District 1) 
Soddy Daisy (District 1)
Tyner Academy

Middle schools
Students in grades 6–8 are served by 21 middle schools.

 Brown Middle	 
 Chattanooga Charter School of Excellence Middle
 Chattanooga Girls Leadership Academy	 
 Chattanooga High Center for Creative Arts	 
 Chattanooga Preparatory School	 
 Chattanooga School for the Arts & Sciences -K-12	
 Chattanooga School for the Liberal Arts	 
 Dalewood Middle	 
 East Hamilton Middle	 
 East Lake Academy	 
 East Ridge Middle	 
 HC Virtual School
 Hixson Middle	 
 Howard Connect Academy	 
 Hunter Middle	
 Ivy Academy	 
 Loftis Middle	 
 Lookout Valley Middle / High	 
 Normal Park Museum Magnet	 
 Ooltewah Middle	 
 Orchard Knob Middle	
 Red Bank Middle
 Sale Creek Middle / High	
 Signal Mountain Middle / High
 Soddy Daisy Middle
 Tyner Middle Academy

Elementary schools
There are 44 elementary schools serving students in grades K-5.

Allen Elementary
Alpine Crest Elementary
Apison Elementary
Barger Academy
Battle Academy
Bess T. Sheperd Elementary
Big Ridge Elementary
Birchwood Elementary
Brown Academy
Calvin Donaldson
Clifton Hills Elementary
Daisy Elementary
Du Pont Elementary
East Brainerd Elementary
East Lake Elementary
East Ridge Elementary
East Side Elementary
Falling Water Elementary
Middle Valley Elementary
Hardy Elementary
Harrison Elementary
Hillcrest Elementary
Hixson Elementary
Lakeside Academy of Math, Science and Technology
Lookout Mountain Elementary
Lookout Valley Elementary
McConnell Elementary
Nolan Elementary
Normal Park Upper
Normal Park Lower
North Hamilton
Ooltewah Elementary
Orchard Knob Elementary
Red Bank Elementary
Rivermont Elementary
Snow Hill Elementary
Soddy Elementary
Spring Creek Elementary
Thrasher Elementary
Tommie F. Brown International Academy
Wallace A. Smith Elementary
Westview Elementary
Wolftever Creek Elementary
Woodmore Elementary

Combination schools
The district has 7 schools that covers grades ranging from K-12 to 6-12.

Chattanooga School for the Arts and Sciences (K-12) CSAS
Chattanooga School for the Liberal Arts (K-8) CSLA
Center for Creative Arts (6–12) CCA
East Hamilton Middle/High School (6–12) East Hamilton (District 7)
Lookout Valley Middle/High School (6–12) Lookout Valley (District 6)
Sale Creek Middle/High School (6–12) Sale Creek (District 1)
Signal Mountain Middle/High School (6–12) Signal Mountain (District 2)

Alternative schools
The system provides four schools to serve special needs students, students at risk, high achievement students, and students with behavioral problems.

Dawn School
Hamilton County High School
Middle College High School
Washington Alternative School

References

External links
 

Education in Hamilton County, Tennessee
School districts in Tennessee
Government agencies with year of establishment missing